Skyhook, sky hook or skyhooks may refer to:

Fiction 
 'Skyhooks' or 'Skyhooks II', parts 1 and 8 respectively of the Adventure Time Elements miniseries.
 Sky Hook, a Hugo-award nominated science fiction fanzine
 Sky Hook (film), a 1999 Yugoslavian film
 'Sky hook', a mechanical device used to supposedly operate The Great Glass Elevator in Roald Dahl's children's book Charlie and the Great Glass Elevator.
 'Sky-Hook', a device used in BioShock Infinite to ride Sky-Lines in Columbia and as a melee weapon
 'Sky hook', a "non-existent" item commonly requested in a construction industry Fool's errand

Music
"Skyhook", a song by Dance Gavin Dance from their second studio album Dance Gavin Dance
 Skyhooks (band), an Australian rock band

Science 
 Skyhook (concept), an explanation of design complexity in the universe that does not build on lower, simpler layers

Sports 
 Hook shot, variant, the signature shot of Basketball Hall of Famer Kareem Abdul-Jabbar
 Skyhook (boarding), a binding used in skateboarding and related sports
 Skyhook (climbing), a hook used in technical climbing
 Skyhook (skydiving), a device for quickly extracting reserve parachutes
 Skyhook (tennis), a smash in which the Eastern grip used to hit the ball further behind the body than is normally possible

Technology 
 Airco DH.6, nicknamed Skyhook, an early (1916) ab initio trainer aircraft
 Australian Autogyro Skyhook, also known as the Minty Skyhook Mini Chopper
 Cessna CH-1, nicknamed Cessna Skyhook, a helicopter produced in the early 1960s by the Cessna Aircraft company that was marketed to the civil sector
 Fulton surface-to-air recovery system, nicknamed Skyhook, a retrieval method by which a flying aircraft picks up a payload
 Skyhook (cable), a hypothetical device used to lift an object on a long cable hanging from the sky
 Skyhook (structure), a space elevator concept 
 Skyhook balloon, a type of unmanned balloon used by the United States Navy in the late 1940s and in the 1950s for atmospheric research
 SkyHook JHL-40, an experimental combination airship/helicopter in development by Boeing, primarily for low impact logging
 Skyhook (skydiving), a type of main-assisted reserve parachute deployment system
 Skyhook theory, a theory used in some automobile suspensions
 Skyhook Wireless, a technology company that invented hybrid location positioning
 Skyhook (Airship), a system used to launch and recover parasite planes from airships.